Darrel Ryan Williams (born 21 September 1995) is an English former first-class cricketer.

Williams was born at Banbury in September 1995. He was educated at Chipping Campden School, before going up to Durham University. While studying at Durham, he played two first-class cricket matches for Durham MCCU against Somerset in 2015 and Essex in 2017. He scored 32 runs in his two matches, while with his leg break bowling he took 3 wickets, with best figures of 2 for 82.

References

External links

1995 births
Living people
People from Banbury
Alumni of Durham University
English cricketers
Durham MCCU cricketers